In Mandaeism, Ptahil also known as Ptahil-Uthra (uthra = angel or guardian), is the Fourth Life, the third of three emanations from the First Life, Hayyi Rabbi, after Yushamin and Abatur. Ptahil-Uthra alone does not constitute the demiurge but only fills that role since he is viewed as the creator of the material world in the Ginza Rabba, often holding an inherently malicious character.

Name
Subsequent scholars have deemed it more probably derived from the Egyptian theonym 'Ptah' and angelic 'il', as originally conjectured by Mark Lidzbarski, although Carl H. Kraeling argued that the influence of Ptah on Mesopotamian syncretic Gnostic traditions is minimal, and opined that the name Ptahil was derived from the dialectal use of the verb (which usage he suggested to have arisen by analogy to the opening of the cosmic egg), and not vice versa. According to James F. McGrath, Ptah and il were identified in Canaan during the era of Egyptian rule of which Ptahil may be derived from.

Parentage
As the Fourth Life, Ptahil is considered to be the son of Abatur, the Third Life. However, in some versions of the narrative, Ptahil originated as the son of the saviour uthra Hibil Ziwa, who inhabits the World of Light, and Zahreil. Zahreil is a lilith from the World of Darkness who dwells in the beds of pregnant women serving to ensure the wellbeing of the child before and after birth; E. S. Drower describes her as a genius of childbirth. Hibil married Zahreil during his descent to the World of Darkness, although some versions of the narrative claim he did not consummate the marriage.

Role
Ptahil is identified with Gabriel and creates the poorly made material world with the help of Ruha, a sinful and fallen female ruler who inhabits the World of Darkness, but cannot provide man with a soul, since she represents the ambivalent "spirit" element rather than the light-world "soul" element. Ruha and Ptahil's roles in creation vary, with each gaining control when the other's power subsides. The Great Life (Hayyi Rabbi) helped Abatur in gaining the secrets of solidification. Abatur in turn passes on the secrets to Ptahil so that he was successful in solidifying the earth in his role as creator of the material world. According to Brikha Nasoraia, the creation of the material world tibil occurs by God's Hayyi Rabbi command, but is delegated to a subservient emanation or uthra Ptahil with the assistance of Gabriel and others.

See also
Gabriel
Prince of Darkness (Manichaeism)
Yaldabaoth

References

Individual angels
Uthras
Ptah